"Real Girl" is a song written by Lenny Kravitz, Niara Scarlett, Matt Ward and Dean Gillard. It includes a sample of Kravitz's "It Ain't Over 'Til It's Over". The song was produced by Matt Ward and Dean Gillard for Mutya Buena's debut album, Real Girl, and was released as the first single from the album on 28 May 2007 in the UK. In Australia, the song was released on 16 June 2007.

"Real Girl" debuted and peaked at number two on the UK Singles Chart on 5 June 2007, held off the top spot by Rihanna's "Umbrella", and it also reached the top 10 in Finland, the Netherlands, and Slovakia. It was shortlisted at the 2008 BRIT Awards for Best British Single. The track was up against Buena's former bandmembers, Sugababes, as well as Leona Lewis, Kate Nash and Take That. "Real Girl" is played in a scene in Sex and the City: The Movie, which was released in May 2008.

Music video
The music video premiered on 3 April 2007, and on Australian music channels on 18 May.

The video shows Buena laying on a bed, writing and looking at pictures in what appears to be a scrapbook. One of the pictures comes to life and a close-up of the scene is shown. It includes Buena taking pictures and partying with a couple of friends. Her sister Dalisay makes a cameo appearance in the clip. As the second part of the chorus kicks in, she is shown hanging out in shops and taking pictures. When the second verse starts, she is in a room seemingly filled with candles. She is then seen singing and wearing a white dress in a totally new background with pictures on the wall. As Buena sings the bridge, many pictures are shown, most notably of Buena wearing a necklace that says "real". She is wearing a short black dress, as seen on the single cover, and singing when the second chorus starts. People are shown dancing as she sings the bridge. As the video closes, we see various photos of Buena and her friends.

Track listing
UK CD single 1
 "Real Girl" (Original Mix) — 3:29
 "Naive" (Recorded at 'The Engine Room') — 3:07

UK CD single 2
 "Real Girl" (Original Mix) — 3:29
 "Real Girl" (Moto Blanco Remix) — 7:24
 "Real Girl" (Primary 1's Real Girls In Another World Mix) — 7:23
 "Real Girl" (Duncan Powell Mix) — 5:58
 "Real Girl" (Video) — 3:29

Charts

Weekly charts

Year-end charts

References

External links
Official site
Watch video

2007 debut singles
2007 songs
4th & B'way Records singles
Contemporary R&B ballads
Mutya Buena songs
Songs written by Lenny Kravitz
Songs written by Matt Ward (record producer)
Songs written by Niara Scarlett